The 2014 Cork Senior Football Championship was the 116th staging of the Cork Senior Football Championship since its establishment by the Cork County Board in 1887. The draw for the opening round fixtures took place in December 2013. The championship began on 2 April 2014 and ended on 19 October 2014.

Castlehaven were the defending champions, however, they were defeated by Carbery Rangers in a Round 4 replay.

On 19 October 2014, Ballincollig won the championship following a 1-13 to 1-10 defeat of Carbery Rangers in the final. It remains their only championship title.

John Hayes from the Carbery Rangers club was the championship's top scorer with 5-28.

Team changes

To Championship

Promoted from the Cork Premier Intermediate Football Championship
 Clyda Rovers

From Championship

Relegated to the Cork Premier Intermediate Football Championship
 Newmarket

Results

Divisions/colleges section

Round 1

Round 2

Round 3

Relegation play-off

Round 4

Quarter-finals

Semi-finals

Final

Championship statistics

Top scorers

Top scorers overall

Top scorers in a single game

Miscellaneous

 Ballincollig win their first title in what was also their first appearance in the final.
 Carbery Rangers make the clubs first appearance in a SFC final since 1906.

References

External links
 2014 Cork Senior Football Championship results

Cork Senior Football Championship